German submarine U-283 was a Type VIIC U-boat of Nazi Germany's Kriegsmarine during World War II.

The submarine was laid down on 10 June 1942 at the Bremer Vulkan yard at Bremen-Vegesack as yard number 48. She was launched on 17 February 1943 and commissioned on 31 March under the command of Oberleutnant zur See Heinz-Günther Scholz.

Design
German Type VIIC submarines were preceded by the shorter Type VIIB submarines. U-283 had a displacement of  when at the surface and  while submerged. She had two shafts and two  propellers.

U-283 was fitted with five  torpedo tubes (four fitted at the bow and one at the stern), fourteen torpedoes, one  SK C/35 naval gun, 220 rounds, and two twin  C/30 anti-aircraft guns. The boat had a complement of between forty-four and sixty.

Service history
U-283 served with the 8th U-boat Flotilla for training from March 1943 to January 1944 and operationally with the 9th flotilla from 1 February. She carried out one patrol, sinking no ships. She was a member of two wolfpacks.

Patrol
The boat's only patrol began with her departure from Kiel on 13 January 1944.

Fate
She was sunk 11 February 1944 southwest of the Faroe Islands by a Canadian Leigh Light equipped Wellington of No. 407 Squadron RCAF.

Forty-nine men died; there were no survivors.

Wolfpacks
U-283 took part in two wolfpacks, namely:
 Stürmer (27 January – 3 February 1944) 
 Igel 1 (3 – 11 February 1944)

References

Bibliography

External links

German Type VIIC submarines
U-boats commissioned in 1943
U-boats sunk in 1944
World War II submarines of Germany
World War II shipwrecks in the Atlantic Ocean
1943 ships
Ships built in Bremen (state)
U-boats sunk by Canadian aircraft
Ships lost with all hands
Maritime incidents in February 1944